Chakravarthy is a 1995 Indian Tamil-language crime film directed by M. Bhaskar. The film stars Karthik and Bhanupriya. It was released on 28 July 1995.

Plot

Chakravarthy (Karthik), a new CID officer, lives in Bhanu's rental house. Bhanu (Bhanupriya) hates the police department, so Chakravarthy lies about his job. His superior (Major Sundarrajan) reveals that Bhanu killed her half-brother Boopathy (Nizhalgal Ravi). Chakravarthy begins to investigate in this odd affair.

Cast

Karthik as Inspector chakravathy
Bhanupriya as Bhanu
Goundamani as Chinnappa
V. K. Ramasamy as Ithiraj
Nizhalgal Ravi as Boopathy
Major Sundarrajan as Sankaran Nair
LIC Narasimhan as Pradeep
Kumarimuthu
Loose Mohan as Naidu
Oru Viral Krishna Rao
Pon. Paramaguru
Radhabai
Sharmili as Ujala
Devi
Mahima
Shanthi
Rajmadhan
Thillai Rajan as Musical instrument dealer

Soundtrack

The film score and the soundtrack were composed by Deva. The soundtrack, released in 1995, features 4 tracks with lyrics written by Pulamaipithan and Muthulingam.

Reception
The Indian Express wrote that the film "leaves much to be desired. The director seems a bit confused in his approach."

References

1995 films
Indian crime films
Films scored by Deva (composer)
1990s Tamil-language films
Films directed by M. Bhaskar
1995 crime films